The 2022–23 First Division League (known as the Yelo League for sponsorship reasons) is the 2nd season of the Saudi First Division League after its rebrand, and the 46th season of the Saudi First Division since its establishment in 1976. The season started on 22 August 2022 and will conclude in May 2023.

Overview

Changes
On 9 October 2020, the Saudi FF announced that the number of teams in the league would be decreased to 18 starting from the 2022–23 season. Due to this decision, 5 teams were relegated last season instead of the usual 4 teams. In addition, only 3 teams were promoted from the Second Division instead of 4 teams.

On 14 April 2022, the Saudi FF announced that the number of teams in the Pro League would be increased from 16 to 18 teams. To prepare for this change, only 2 teams would be relegated to the First Division League and 4 teams would be promoted to the Pro League.

Team changes
The following teams have changed division since the 2022–23 season.

To the First Division League
Promoted from Second Division
 Al-Arabi
 Al-Qaisumah
 Al-Riyadh

Relegated from Pro League
 Al-Hazem
 Al-Ahli
 Al-Faisaly

From the First Division League
Promoted to Pro League
 Al-Khaleej
 Al-Adalah
 Al-Wehda

Relegated to Second Division
 Al-Jeel
 Al-Diriyah
 Al-Nahda
 Al-Kawkab
 Bisha

Teams
A total of 18 teams are contesting the league, including 12 sides from the 2021–22 season, the three promoted teams from the Second Division and the three relegated sides from the Pro League.

The first club to be relegated to the First Division League was Al-Hazem following a 5–2 defeat away to Al-Ettifaq on 21 May. Al-Hazem were relegated after just one year in the top flight. This was their second relegation in three years. Both Al-Ahli and Al-Faisaly were relegated following on the final day of the season. Al-Ahli were relegated following a 0–0 away draw with Al-Shabab. Al-Ahli were relegated for the first time in their history while Al-Faisaly were relegated after 12 consecutive seasons in the top flight.

The first club to be promoted was Al-Arabi who were promoted following a 1–0 home win against Al-Rawdhah on 30 March 2022. On 31 March 2022, Al-Qaisumah became the second side to be promoted following a 2–1 win over Al-Nairyah. The third and final club to be promoted was Al-Riyadh, who were promoted following a 3–2 aggregate win over Al-Taraji in the promotion play-offs.

Al-Arabi were crowned champions after defeating Al-Qaisumah 1–0 to win their second title and first since 1986.

Al-Arabi return to the First Division League after an absence of 27 years. They return to the league for the first time since the 1994–95 season and will play in their 9th overall season. Al-Qaisumah return after an absence of three seasons and will play in their 4th overall season in the First Division League. Al-Riyadh return after an absence of six seasons and will play in their 18th overall season in the First Division League.

Stadia and locations

Note: Table lists in alphabetical order.

Foreign players
On 15 April 2022, the Saudi FF announced that the number of foreign players was increased from 5 players to 6 players.

Players name in bold indicates the player is registered during the mid-season transfer window.

League table

Positions by round
The table lists the positions of teams after each week of matches. In order to preserve chronological evolvements, any postponed matches are not included in the round at which they were originally scheduled but added to the full round they were played immediately afterward.

Results

Statistics

Scoring

Top scorers

Hat-tricks 

Note
(H) – Home; (A) – Away

Clean sheets

Awards

Monthly awards

Round awards

Number of teams by region

See also
 2022–23 Saudi Professional League
 2022–23 Saudi Second Division
 2022–23 Saudi Third Division

References

2
Saudi First Division League seasons
Saudi Arabia, 2